Jaén District is one of twelve districts of the province Jaén in Peru.

See also
Montegrande (archaeological site)

References

External links